Longitudinal fasciculus may refer to:

 Dorsal longitudinal fasciculus
 Inferior longitudinal fasciculus 
 Medial longitudinal fasciculus